Temple Beth-El is a synagogue located in San Antonio, Texas, USA.  Founded in 1874, it is the oldest synagogue in South Texas.  The current temple is located at the corner of Belknap and W. Ashby, just north of San Antonio Community College.

Temple Beth-El is a Reform Jewish congregation, and a founding member of the Union for Reform Judaism. In its early years the congregation's practice was informed by the assimilationist ideals of the Reform movement, which emphasized social justice and ethical practice more than traditional Jewish ritual.  The opening of Temple Beth-El's first building in 1874 was celebrated by local church choirs signing together with the temple's.  A second building was built in 1902; during its construction the temple met in a neighboring Baptist church, and in turn various Christian congregations held their services in the temple building for many years. From 1897 to 1920 the rabbi was Samuel Marks, who was an active participant in the civic activities of the state.   From 1923 to 1942, the congregation was led by Rabbi Ephraim Frisch, a prominent activist rabbi who was the son-in-law of one of Texas' best known rabbis, Henry Cohen of Galveston.  Frisch was controversial for his outspoken positions on a wide range of political and economic issues: he opposed Zionism (as many Reform rabbis did at the time), supported teaching evolution in the schools, spoke against the poll tax, and advocated for workers' rights.  After a particularly controversial public letter decrying a police raid and arrest of labor activists, the congregation ultimately forced Frisch to retire in 1942.

Frisch's successor, David Jacobson, had a less confrontational style but was also politically active. While serving as Frisch's associate rabbi in 1938, he chaired a city commission examining the city's economic and social issues.  Jacobson served as a Navy chaplain during World War II.  Returning after the war, he continued to be active in social issues, notably as a persistent advocate of racial desegregation in the city.  Jacobson's tenure also saw the congregation make some moves away from the Classical Reform style of worship,  adopting rituals such as the bar mitzvah and instructing students in Hebrew.

As the congregation grew, another new building had been opened in 1927, with room in the sanctuary for 1200, as well as a community center building with classrooms.  This was expanded in 1946 with an auditorium, social hall and new chapel.  When Rabbi Jacobson retired in 1976, the congregation had 853 families. Under the next rabbi, Samuel M. Stahl, it grew to more than 1100 families by 1995. Barry Block became senior rabbi in 2002 and served until 2013, his tenure ending with a lengthy sabbatical after controversy within the congregation led to his negotiated departure.

Still known as one of San Antonio's more contemporary places of worship, Temple Beth-El is very open in their support of the Jewish and LGBT community.  Rabbi Mara Nathan became the Temple's senior rabbi in July, 2014. The Temple is also served by Associate Rabbi Marina Yergin,  and Cantor Julie Berlin, as well as Rabbi Emeritus Stahl.

See also
Jewish Texan
Oldest synagogues in the United States

References

External links 

Temple Beth-El - The official website.
A photo of Temple Beth-El's 1904 building can be seen at https://web.archive.org/web/20110928032453/http://www.nmajh.org/exhibitions/postcards/images/58.jpg

History of San Antonio
Reform synagogues in Texas
Founding members of the Union for Reform Judaism
Religious buildings and structures in San Antonio
Religious organizations established in 1874
1874 establishments in Texas
Synagogues completed in 1927
Synagogue buildings with domes